Sorry You've Been Troubled is a 1942 thriller novel by the British writer Peter Cheyney. It was the fifth book in his series featuring the hardboiled London-based private detective Slim Callaghan. It was published in the United States under the alternative title of  Farewell to the Admiral.

Synopsis
Callaghan barges into a case involving a £40,000 insurance claim following a suspicious-looking suicide, despite the fact that he doesn't represent any client.

Film adaptation
It was made into a 1955 French film Your Turn, Callaghan directed by Willy Rozier and starring Tony Wright, Lysiane Rey and Colette Ripert.

References

Bibliography
 Goble, Alan. The Complete Index to Literary Sources in Film. Walter de Gruyter, 1999.
 Magill, Frank Northen. Critical Survey of Mystery and Detective Fiction: Authors, Volume 1. Salem Press, 1988.
 Reilly, John M. Twentieth Century Crime & Mystery Writers. Springer, 2015.
 Server, Lee. Encyclopedia of Pulp Fiction Writers. Infobase Publishing, 2014.

1942 British novels
Novels by Peter Cheyney
British thriller novels
Novels set in London
British crime novels
British novels adapted into films
William Collins, Sons books